Dennis Coslett (12 September 1939 – 20 May 2004) was a Welsh political activist, best known as a member of the Free Wales Army, who became notorious in 1969.

Born in Carmarthen, Coslett was conscripted at the age of 18. He served as an infantryman with the Royal Welch Fusiliers and later became a merchant seaman. On his return to Wales, Coslett worked as a shot-firer in many of the small private coal mines in west Wales. Coslett lost the use of his left eye in an accident underground, and subsequently lost his job.

The flooding of the Tryweryn valley and destruction of Welsh language communities had sparked controversy. Many Welsh nationalists became frustrated by the refusal of Plaid Cymru to take a tougher stance on such issues at the time. Coslett had initially set up his own militant group, the Welsh Republican Army, but in 1965, he joined forces with Julian Cayo-Evans' as part of the Free Wales Army.

The pair were interviewed on television by David Frost in 1967. Frost made a number of facetious comments and referred to Coslett as Dai Dayan, because of his resemblance to Moshe Dayan, the Israeli general who also wore a patch on his left eye. However, both Coslett and Cayo-Evans were adept at courting the media and publicising their gatherings, which were essentially harmless. The Free Wales Army was also quite happy to take the credit for acts of protest committed by other organisations, such as explosions, damage to second homes owned by English people and the defacing or destruction of English language road signs.

Fundamentally, their self-publicity led to their imprisonment, as the police were under pressure to react to protests and threats of violence which preceded the investiture of the Prince of Wales at Caernarfon. Many members of the Free Wales Army were subsequently charged with various offences, including Coslett and Evans; the latter faced eight charges under the Public Order Act at the trial in Swansea in May 1969. The trial lasted 53 days, with Coslett refusing to speak in English throughout the hearing. He and Cayo-Evans were each sentenced to 15 months imprisonment, although the case rested on little more than press cuttings, including exaggerated claims which Evans and Coslett had themselves uttered to journalists.

Following his release from prison, Coslett began his new career as a poet, essayist and speaker, publishing two books, Rebel Heart and Patriots and Scoundrels.

Coslett married Averil Webb, and had a daughter and two sons. He died at hospital in Llanelli, Carmarthenshire on 20 May 2004.

References

1939 births
2004 deaths
Welsh rebels
Welsh republicans
Welsh nationalists
Welsh activists
Welsh writers
British Merchant Navy personnel
Royal Welch Fusiliers soldiers
Welsh prisoners and detainees
Prisoners and detainees of England and Wales